Margaret Hughes  (c. 1630–1719) was an English actress; mistress of Prince Rupert of the Rhine.

Margaret Hughes may also refer to:

Margaret Hughes (sportswriter) (1919–2005), English sportswriter
Margaret Hughes (Los Angeles) (1826–1915), first woman member of the Los Angeles City Board of Education
Margaret Hughes (bowls), lawn bowler from Zambia
Margaret Hughes, a character in The Wiser Sex
Margaret Hughes, Miss Australia 1949